Spike Jones in Stereo (also known as Spike Jones in Hi-Fi and A Spooktacular in Screaming Sound) (1959) is a comedy album by musical-satirist Spike Jones. Unlike his previous recordings, which make fun of genres such as Christmas and classical music, Spike Jones in Stereo is a send up of everything horror.

Making a notable guest appearance on the album is Paul Frees, who plays the voice of Dracula, Doctor Von Steiner, and one of the heads on the two headed monster. Loulie Jean Norman, Thurl Ravenscroft, and George Rock (the voice on Jones's only number one hit "All I Want for Christmas (Is My Two Front Teeth)") also lend their voices.

The album was the first of Spike Jones original releases to have been re-issued on CD.

Track listing
 "I Only Have Eyes For You" – 3.30
 "Poisen to Poisen" – 4.39
 "Teenage Brain Surgeon" – 3.03
 "(All Of A Sudden) My Heart Sings" – 3.13
 "Everything Happens to Me" – 3.48
 "Monster Movie Ball" – 2.45
 "Tammy" – 4.19
 "My Old Flame" – 4.22
 "This is Your Death/Two Heads Are Better Than One" – 9.24
 "Spooktacular Finale" – 2.34

Personnel
 Spike Jones – drums, vocals, bandleader
 Paul Frees – vocals, impersonations
 Loulie Jean Norman – vocals, impersonations
 Thurl Ravenscroft – vocals
 George Rock – trumpet, vocals
 Ken Stevens – vocals

Production
 Producer: Alvino Rey
 Executive Producer: Gordon Anderson
 Engineer: Thorne Nogar
 Editing: Thorne Nogar
 Mixing: Thorne Nogar
 Mastering: Bob Fisher
 Arranging: Carl Brandt, Spike Jones
 Cover Art: Jim Jonson
 Cover Painting: Jim Jonson
 Liner Notes: Joseph F. Laredo

Spike Jones albums
1959 albums
Warner Records albums
1950s comedy albums